In biology, a tropism is a phenomenon indicating growth or turning movement of an organism, usually a plant, in response to an environmental stimulus. In tropisms, this response is dependent on the direction of the stimulus (as opposed to nastic movements which are non-directional responses). Tropisms are usually named for the stimulus involved; for example, a phototropism is a reaction to sunlight.

Tropisms occur in three sequential steps. First, there is a sensation to a stimulus. Next, signal transduction occurs. And finally, the directional growth response occurs. 

Tropisms are typically associated with plants (although not necessarily restricted to them). Where an organism is capable of directed physical movement (motility), movement or activity in response to a specific stimulus is more likely to be regarded by behaviorists as a taxis (directional response) or a kinesis (non-directional response).

The Cholodny–Went model, proposed in 1927, is an early model describing tropism in emerging shoots of monocotyledons, including the tendencies for the stalk to grow towards light (phototropism) and the roots to grow downward (gravitropism).
In both cases the directional growth is considered to be due to asymmetrical distribution of auxin, a plant growth hormone.

The term "tropism" is also used in unrelated contexts. Viruses and other pathogens affect what is called "host tropism", "tissue tropism", or "cell tropism"; in which case tropism refers to the way in which different viruses/pathogens have evolved to preferentially target specific host species, specific tissue, or specific cell types within those species. In English, the word tropism is also used to indicate an action done without cognitive thought: However, "tropism" in this sense has a proper, although non-scientific, meaning as an innate tendency, natural inclination, or propensity to act in a certain manner towards a certain stimulus.

Types 
Tropisms can be distinguished according to the orientation with respect to the direction of the stimulus. They can commonly be either positive (towards the stimulus) or negative (away from it). Both of these are orthotropic, and can be contrasted with tropisms that are diatropic (perpendicular to the stimulus) or plagiotropic (at an oblique angle).

According to the type of stimulus, tropisms can be:

 Aerotropism, growth of plants towards or away from a source of oxygen
 Chemotropism, movement or growth in response to chemicals
 Electrotropism, or galvanotropism, movement or growth in response to an electric field
 Exotropism, continuation of growth "outward," i.e. in the previously established direction
 Gravitropism, sometimes referred to as geotropism, movement or growth in response to gravity
 Apogeotropism, negative geotropism
 Heliotropism, diurnal motion or seasonal motion of plant parts in response to the direction of the Sun, (e.g. the sunflower)
 Apheliotropism, negative heliotropism
 Hydrotropism, movement or growth in response to water; in plants, the root cap senses differences in water moisture in the soil, and signals cellular changes that causes the root to curve towards the area of higher moisture
 Prohydrotropism, positive hydrotropism
 Hygrotropism, movement or growth in response to moisture or humidity
 Magnetotropism, movement or growth in response to magnetic fields
 Phototropism, movement or growth in response to lights or colors of light
 Aphototropism, negative phototropism
 Skototropism, negative phototropism of vines
 Selenotropism, motion of plant parts in response to the direction of the moon
 Thermotropism, movement or growth in response to temperature
 Thigmotropism, movement or growth in response to touch or contact
 Traumatotropism, orientation deviation after suffering a wounding

See also 

 Chemotaxis
 Rapid plant movement

References